The club throw is an athletic throwing event where the objective is to throw a wooden club. The event is one of the four throwing events, along with discus, javelin and shot put of the Summer Paralympics. It is the Paralympic equivalent of the hammer throw. The club throw was introduced for both men and women at the first 1960 Summer Paralympic Games. It was dropped from the women's programme from the 1992 Paralympics in Barcelona but was reinstated for London 2012.

Sport rules

Like other throwing events, the competition is decided by who can throw the club the farthest, though when the event is contested by athletes of different disability classifications, such as the Paralympics, the result is decided by a points score using the Raza Points System which considers athletes' relative levels of disability. The frame is common for each competitor and is rigid. The sport is contested at the Paralympics by athletes in the F31, F32 and F51 classes (individuals with the most significant impairment in hand function).

Records
 the world record for the men's club in the 32 class is held by Maciej Sochal, who threw  at the 2016 IPC Athletics European Championships.

 the world record for the women's club in the 32 class is held by Maroua Ibrahmi, who threw  at the 2016 Summer Paralympics.

Paralympics

Men

Women

See also 
 Athletics at the Summer Paralympics
 Disability sport classification

References

 
Individual sports
Events in track and field
Throwing sports